In the Flat Field is the debut studio album by English gothic rock band Bauhaus. It was recorded between December 1979 and July 1980, and was released on 3 November 1980 by record label 4AD, the first full-length release on that label. The cover artwork is a reproduction of Duane Michals' 1949 photograph, Homage to Puvis de Chavannes.

The album is considered one of the first gothic rock records.

Recording 
Following a 30-date tour, Bauhaus went to Southern Studios in London to record their first album. The band had a clear conception of how they wanted the record to sound; hence, they opted to produce it themselves. While most of the album was completed with the planned release date of September 1980, the group found it difficult to record a version of "Double Dare" as good as the one they performed on disc jockey John Peel's BBC Radio 1 programme. Bauhaus applied to the BBC to use the Peel session version, but due to obstruction from the Musicians Union, the process took over a month.

Music 
NMEs Andy Gill wrote that the dark atmosphere of the record was reminiscent of previous works by groups including Siouxsie and the Banshees, Adam and the Ants, and Joy Division. In his AllMusic review, critic Ned Raggett described Bauhaus as a "glam-inspired rock band", said that singer Peter Murphy channeled both Iggy Pop and David Bowie, and compared Daniel Ash's guitar playing to that of Mick Ronson. Raggett noted that the album concluded with "a dramatic ending" with the song "Nerves".

Release 
In the Flat Field was released on 3 November 1980 by record label 4AD. It was met with a negative response from critics, but topped the UK Independent Albums Chart and made the UK Albums Chart for one week, peaking at No. 72.

The album was first released on CD by 4AD in April 1988 with eight bonus tracks, including three non-album singles: "Dark Entries", "Terror Couple Kill Colonel", and a cover of T. Rex's "Telegram Sam". Five of these bonus tracks had been previously compiled on the 4AD EP in 1983.

On 19 October 2009, 4AD and Beggars Banquet reissued the album as an "Omnibus Edition", featuring the 24-bit John Dent remastered CD of the original nine-track album in a replica mini-LP sleeve (with corresponding inner sleeve featuring the lyrics), plus a 16-track bonus disc of singles, outtakes, alternate recordings, and original versions. The set came inside a semi-long box, coupled with a 48-page book that included comments from band members, photos, complete lyrics, complete tour date information for 1979 and 1980, and an essay by Andrew Brooksbank on the formation and creation of the band, the singles, and the album.

Critical reception 

While In the Flat Field received positive reviews in fanzine publications, the album was "absolutely slated" by the British weekly music press, according to Bauhaus biographer Ian Shirley. NME described the album as "nine meaningless moans and flails bereft of even the most cursory contour of interest, a record which deserves all the damning adjectives usually levelled at grim-faced 'modernists'". Reviewer Andy Gill then ultimately dismissed them as "a hip Black Sabbath". Dave McCullough of Sounds was also negative: "No songs. Just tracks (ugh). Too priggish and conceited. Sluggish indulgence instead of hoped for goth-ness. Coldly catatonic."

The American Trouser Press, however, described it as "a dense, disjointed patchwork of sounds and uncertain feelings, supported by a pressured, incessant beat. Delving deep into the dark side of the human psyche, Bauhaus conjures up unsettling images of a world given over to death and decay."

In his AllMusic retrospective review, Raggett praised the album, writing "few debut albums ever arrived so nearly perfectly formed". while Trebles Jeff Terich described the songs as "twisted, glam-inspired post-punk raveups". Jonathan Selzer of Classic Rock magazine described the album as "remarkably self-possessed, a distillation of influences down to a potent curtains-drawn universe of Bauhaus's own."

Legacy 
AllMusic's Raggett wrote: "In the Flat Field practically single-handedly invented what remains for many as the stereotype of goth music—wracked, at times spindly vocals about despair and desolation of many kinds, sung over mysterious and moody music". In 2012, Sonic Seducer ranked In the Flat Field at No. 4 on its list of "10 Key Albums for the Gothic Scene", calling it a work that had shattered outdated ideas of rock music. Music author Dave Thompson described it as "one of the most courageous albums of the age." Writing for Louder Than War, John Robb noted it as "a staple record for the true post-punk scene". American musician and audio engineer, Steve Albini, from the industrial rock band Big Black called the album a "masterpiece".

In the Flat Field was listed in Tom Moon's 2008 book 1,000 Recordings to Hear Before You Die. In 2020, Rolling Stone included the album at No. 61 on its list of "The 80 Greatest Albums of 1980".

Track listing 

 Note: In Canada, "Telegram Sam" was included as track 2 on side B.

Personnel 
Credits are sourced from the liner notes of the original release.
 Bauhaus – production, instruments, lyrics, arrangements, sleeve design
 Tony Cook – engineering
 Glenn Campling – sleeve design
 Stella Watts – photography
 Geoff Smith – photography
 Piers Bannister – photography
 Eugene Merinov – photography
 Duane Michals - Front Cover Photograph "Homage to Puvis de Charannes", credited to Artists Postcards 1978. N.Y.C. (Series II)

References 

 Sources

External links 
 

1980 debut albums
4AD albums
Bauhaus (band) albums